Rahim Mangal (born 25 July 1995) is an Afghan cricketer. He made his List A debut for Band-e-Amir Region in the 2017 Ghazi Amanullah Khan Regional One Day Tournament on 10 August 2017. He was the leading run-scorer in the tournament, making 276 runs in five innings. He made his first-class debut for Mis Ainak Region in the 2017–18 Ahmad Shah Abdali 4-day Tournament on 20 October 2017. He made his Twenty20 debut on 12 October 2019, for Amo Sharks in the 2019 Shpageeza Cricket League.

References

External links
 

1995 births
Living people
Afghan cricketers
Band-e-Amir Dragons cricketers
Kabul Eagles cricketers
Mis Ainak Knights cricketers
Place of birth missing (living people)